The women's 5000 metres event at the 2000 World Junior Championships in Athletics was held in Santiago, Chile, at Estadio Nacional Julio Martínez Prádanos on 17 October.

Medalists

Results

Final
17 October

Participation
According to an unofficial count, 14 athletes from 10 countries participated in the event.

References

5000 metres
Long distance running at the World Athletics U20 Championships